The Wishes and the Glitch (2008) is the fifth full-length album by Say Hi. It was released on CD and on Vinyl.

Track listing
 "Northwestern Girls" – 3:41
 "Shakes Her Shoulders" – 3:36
 "Toil and Trouble" – 3:06
 "Back Before We Were Brittle" – 3:05
 "Oboes Bleat and Triangles Tink" – 2:26
 "Magic Beans and Truth Machines" – 2:03
 "Bluetime" – 3:10
 "Spiders" – 3:18
 "Zero to Love" – 4:07
 "Apples for the Innocent" – 3:38
 "We Lost the Albatross" – 3:44

References

2008 albums
Say Hi albums